Lecanogaster is a genus of clingfishes from the family Gobiesocidae. They are found in the Atlantic Ocean off the coast of west Africa. The genus was designated as a monotypic genus in 1957 by John C. Briggs but in 2017 a second species was assigned to the genus.

Species
Lecanogaster chrysea Briggs, 1957
Lecanogaster gorgoniphila Fricke & Wirtz, 2017

References

Gobiesocidae
Ray-finned fish genera